Ralph Benjamin Somerset (c. 1835 – 23 March 1891) was an English clergyman.  He was the first Censor of Fitzwilliam House, Cambridge

Born in Bradwell, Derbyshire, he was the son of  Benjamin Somerset.  He was educated at Manchester Grammar School and Trinity College, Cambridge.  He was a fellow at Trinity from 1859 until 1869, whereupon he was compelled to resign due to his marriage to Frances, daughter of T. Brocklehurst, of Macclesfield.  However, he became the first  First Censor of Non-Collegiate students at Fitzwilliam House from 1869-1881.  Venn notes that "it was to his energy that the success of the scheme was in a great measure due".

He was vicar of St Michael's Church, Cambridge from 1868 to 1875.

He died in Cambridge.

References 

1830s births
1891 deaths
Censors of Fitzwilliam House, Cambridge
People from Derbyshire Dales (district)